Lallemantia is a genus of flowering plants in the family Lamiaceae. It is named after the German botanist Julius Léopold Eduard Avé-Lallemant.

There are five species in the genus. They are native to central and southwestern Asia. They are annual or biennial herbs. They have been used for various purposes. Lallemantia iberica is cultivated as an oilseed crop.

Species 
 Lallemantia baldshuanica Gontsch. - Iran, Afghanistan, Turkmenistan, Tajikistan, Kyrgyzstan  
 Lallemantia canescens (L.) Fisch. & C.A.Mey. - Turkey, Iran, Caucasus 
 Lallemantia iberica  (M.Bieb.) Fisch. & C.A.Mey. - Turkey, Iran, Turkmenistan, Caucasus, Iraq, Syria, Lebanon, Israel 
 Lallemantia peltata  (L.) Fisch. & C.A.Mey. - Turkey, Iran, Turkmenistan, Caucasus; Oregon and Wyoming USA (introduced)
 Lallemantia royleana (Benth.) Benth. - Western Siberia, Central Asia, Xinjiang, Pakistan, Kashmir, Iran, Syria, Saudi Arabia, Persian Gulf sheikdoms

References

Lamiaceae
Lamiaceae genera
Flora of temperate Asia
Flora of Central Asia
Flora of Western Asia
Taxa named by Carl Anton von Meyer